Camponotus variegatus is a species of carpenter ant (genus Camponotus).

Diet
They will eat small insects, honeydew, and most common pantry foods.

Subspecies
Camponotus variegatus ambonensis Karavaiev, 1930 - Indonesia
Camponotus variegatus bacchus Smith, F., 1858 - Sri Lanka
Camponotus variegatus batta Menozzi, 1930 - Indonesia
Camponotus variegatus cleon Forel, 1913 - Indonesia
Camponotus variegatus comottoi Emery, 1887 - Myanmar
Camponotus variegatus crassinodis Forel, 1892 - Philippines, Myanmar
Camponotus variegatus dulcis Dalla Torre, 1893 - China, Myanmar, Philippines.
Camponotus variegatus flavotestaceus Donisthorpe, 1948 - New Guinea
Camponotus variegatus fuscithorax Dalla Torre, 1893 - India
Camponotus variegatus infuscus Forel, 1892 - India
Camponotus variegatus intrans Forel, 1911 - Sri Lanka
Camponotus variegatus proles Emery, 1925 - Laos
Camponotus variegatus somnificus Forel, 1902 - India
Camponotus variegatus stenonotus Stitz, 1938 - Borneo
Camponotus variegatus variegatus Smith, F., 1858 - Hawaii, Micronesia, Bangladesh, China, Turkey

References

External links

 at antwiki.org
Itis.gov
Animaldiversity.org

variegatus
Hymenoptera of Asia
Insects described in 1858